Robert of Gloucester may refer to one of two persons prominent in medieval England:

Robert, 1st Earl of Gloucester (-1147), major figure in The Anarchy and supporter of Empress Matilda against King Stephen
Robert of Gloucester (historian) (  – )), chronicler of early English history